Lake Hillcrest is a lake in Madison County, Illinois, United States.

References

Hillcrest
Bodies of water of Madison County, Illinois